The Black Filmmakers Hall of Fame, Inc. (BFHFI), was founded in 1974, in Oakland, California. It supported and promoted black filmmaking, and preserved the contributions by African-American artists both before and behind the camera. It also sponsored advance screenings of films by and about people of African descent and hosted the Oscar Micheaux Awards Ceremony, held each February, from 1974 to 1993, in Oakland.

The Hall started as the Black Filmmakers Hall of Fame in 1974, as an all-volunteer project of Oakland Museum of California's Cultural and Ethnics Affairs Guild. It grew quickly, incorporating as BFHFI in 1977. As of February 2, 2023, long standing board member George D. Tribble of the BFHFI Family made the announcement that the "Black Film Week Foundation" has now established a perpetual relationship with Black Filmmakers Hall of Fame and together will preserve all contributions, honor and celebrate the many achievements of filmmakers of African descent. The board of directors of Black Film Week Foundation are extremely pleased and proud of the path and direction the organization is currently on. It has taken some time, dedication and sacrifice to see a shared collective vision of many accomplishments. 
"As one of the co-founders of the Black Film Week Foundation, it was key for us to establish this new paradigm while restoring an organization from the past that played a vital and instrumental role with the advancement of our unique now thriving filmmaking community. We are encouraging all Black film enthusiast to become members of our organization, so we can collectively celebrate and unify our stride as we emerge to attain success beyond our ancestor's wildest imaginations. Supporting and promoting filmmakers of African descent while preserving all contributions made by this group of creative individuals is our commitment.
As Oscar Micheaux's enshrined legacy Black Film Week is thrilled to have a new generation of MiChaux family phenomena's as one of the co -founders. www.blackfilmweek.org
 
 In 2014, all its archives were given to the Black Film Center/Archive, within the College of Arts and Sciences at Indiana University Bloomington.

This is a partial list of inductees:

Inductees

1974
Alvin Childress
Lillian Cumber
Ossie Davis
Sammy Davis Jr.
Katherine Dunham (1909–2006)
Theresa Harris
Eugene Jackson
William Marshall
Juanita Moore
Clarence Muse
Gordon Parks Sr.
Lincoln Theodore Perry (stage name Stepin Fetchit) (1902–1985)
Beah Richards
Paul Robeson (1898–1976)
Vincent Tubbs
Lorenzo Tucker
Leigh Whipper

1975
Ruby Dee (1922–2014)
Allen Hoskins (1920–1980)
Hall Johnson (1888–1970)
Abbey Lincoln (1930–2010)
Hattie McDaniel (1895–1952)
Butterfly McQueen (1911–1995)
Louis S. Peterson (1922–1998)
Fredi Washington (1903–1994)

1976
Eubie Blake (1887–1983)
Louise Beavers (1902–1962)
Oscar Micheaux (1884–1951)
Brock Peters (1927–2005)
Melvin Van Peebles (1932-2021)
Diahann Carroll (1935–2019)

1977
Maidie Norman (1912–1998)
Cicely Tyson (1924-2021)

1978
Benny Carter (1907–2003)
Nicholas Brothers - Fayard (1914-2006), Harold (1921-2000)
Nina Mae McKinney (1912–1967)
Sidney Poitier (1927-2022)

1979
Lonne Elder III (1927–1996)
Earl "Fatha" Hines (1903–1983)
Herb Jeffries (1913–2014)
Etta Moten Barnett (1901–2004)
Oodgeroo Noonuccal (1920–1993)
Floyd Norman (born 1935)
Diana Sands (1934–1973)
Leo D. Sullivan
Paul Winfield (1939–2004)

1980
Vinnette Carroll (1922–2002)
Ivan Dixon (1931–2008)
James Edwards (1918–1970)
William Greaves (1926–2014)
Lillian Randolph (1898–1980)
Frank Silvera (1914–1970)
Woody Strode (1914–1994)

1982
Cab Calloway (1907–1994)

1984
Billy Dee Williams (born 1937)

1986
Madame Sul-Te-Wan (1873–1959)

1987
Sammy Davis, Jr. (1925–1990)
Scatman Crothers (1910–1986)
Jeni Le Gon (1916–2012)
Ernie Morrison (1912–1989)

1990
Suzanne de Passe (born 1948)
Danny Glover (born 1946)

1991
Michael Schultz (born 1938)
August Wilson (1945–2005)

1993
Madeline Anderson (born 1923/4)
Rosalind Cash (1938–1995)

1994

1995
William D. Alexander (1916–1991)

See also
Black Reel Awards
Mary Perry Smith

Additional resources
Indiana University maintains the Black Filmmakers Hall of Fame Archives.

References

Moon, Spencer. Reel Black Talk: A Sourcebook of 50 American Filmmakers, Greenwood Press, (1997) - 
Peterson, Bernard L. Profiles of African American Stage Performers and Theatre People, 1816–1960, Greenwood Press, (2000) - 

African-American cinema
American film awards
Media museums in California
Halls of fame in California
Organizations based in Oakland, California
African-American history in Oakland, California
Awards established in 1974
Museums established in 1974
1974 establishments in California